Konstantīns Visotskis (Russian: Константин Семёнович Высотский, 29 May 1864 – 6 January 1938) was a Russian and Latvian painter. He graduated from the Moscow School of Painting, Sculpture and Architecture in 1891 and exhibited at Moscow art exhibitions, including those of the Peredvizhniki. The main subjects of his work were nature and animals. After the 1917, revolution in Russia he emigrated to Riga. His work was part of the art competitions at the 1928 Summer Olympics, the 1932 Summer Olympics, and the 1936 Summer Olympics.

References

External links
 Selection of artworks on "Russians in Latvia" website

1864 births
1938 deaths
20th-century Latvian painters
19th-century painters from the Russian Empire
20th-century Russian painters
Latvian painters
Olympic competitors in art competitions
Artists from Moscow
Peredvizhniki
Russian landscape painters
Artists from Riga
Moscow School of Painting, Sculpture and Architecture alumni